Grzegorz Piramowicz (Grigor Pirumyan) (25 November 1735 in Lwów – 14 November 1801 in Międzyrzec Podlaski) was a Polish Roman Catholic priest, educator, writer, and philosopher of Armenian origin. He was a member of the Commission of National Education and Society for Elementary Books, and one of the founders of the Society of Friends of the Constitution.

He was born into an Armenian merchant family.

References

1735 births
1801 deaths
Polish Roman Catholic priests
Polish educators
Polish people of Armenian descent
Clergy from Lviv
Catholic philosophers
18th-century Polish–Lithuanian philosophers